Eremophila glabra subsp. glabra is a plant in the figwort family, Scrophulariaceae and is endemic to  the mainland states of Australia.  It is similar to other shrubs in the species Eremophila glabra but it distinguished from them by the pattern of fine hairs on the stems. It is found in the drier parts of the continent, including to the west of the Great Dividing Range in the eastern states.

Description
The stems are covered with fine white hairs, except for a strip underneath the leaf attachment, so that the hairs are in bands down the stems interspersed with glabrous bands.

There are 5 partly overlapping sepals which are narrow triangular to egg shaped and 5 petals forming a tube except at the ends where the lowest lobe is thinner that the rest and is turned back below the flower.

Taxonomy and namingEremophila glabra subsp. glabra is an autonym and therefore the taxonomy is the same as for Eremophila glabra.

Distribution and habitatEremophila glabra subsp. glabra'' occurs in every mainland state of Australia, including the drier inland parts of New South Wales, southern Queensland and Victoria. It is found throughout South Australia and in the southern half of the Northern Territory and Western Australia. It grows in a wide range of soils and vegetation associations.

References

External links
Eremophila glabra subsp. glabra: Occurrence data from Australasian Virtual Herbarium

glabra subsp. glabra